"The Monster of Lake LaMetrie" is a short story by American writer Wardon Allan Curtis. It was originally published in September 1899 in Pearson's Magazine and collected in Sam Moskowitz's Science Fiction by Gaslight and Michael Moorcock's England Invaded.

Plot
The story is told through the extracts of a diary written from 1896 to 1897 by a professor and physician named James McLennegan, addressed to a colleague, Professor William G. Breyfogle.

McLennegan had been studying Lake LaMetrie, a lake within the mountains of Wyoming. With him was a sickly boy named Edward Framingham, who came along in hopes of recovering from dyspepsia. McLennegan's reason for studying the lake is for its remarkable property of prehistoric life washing ashore, such as tree-like ferns and placoderms. McLennegan believes that the lake is connected to an “inner earth” from which the plants and animals originate.

One night, a loud roaring brings McLennegan's and Framingham's attention to the lake. The roaring is the result of the lake's rapid rising, which forces McLennegan and Framingham out of their makeshift house. The next morning, the lake's level is back to normal as the result of a whirlpool. McLennegan knows this to be one of the lake's discharges of strange life, and discovers what seems to be a short, thick log with a long root attached to it. The next day, while walking along the shore, McLennegan finds that the “log” is actually a live Elasmosaurus. The beast attacks him, but McLennegan slices the top of its head off with a machete and removes its brain, which is found to be remarkably a lot like a human's. Despite the brain's removal, the creature's body continues to operate.

The next day, Framingham almost dies, with only his mind still functioning. Using his knowledge and skills of surgery, McLennegan removes Framingham's brain and grafts it into the Elasmosaurus’s head. Seven days later, the beast begins to stir, and five days after that, starts to interact with McLennegan – the beast can understand him, and later is able to speak somewhat rudimentarily.

Although the situation is peaceful at first, Framingham's behavior has significantly changed a year later to that of the animal his mind controls. McLennegan's last entry indicates that he will be leaving.

The narrative is then revealed to have been found by a military captain, Arthur Fairchild, who discovered the beast eating McLennegan while searching for Native Americans who left their reservation. He had ordered the team to fire upon the creature, killing it, and found the manuscript with McLennegan's remains.

Reception
Algis Budrys said that the story was effective but wished that the author had further developed events.

References

External links
 
 

1899 short stories
Science fiction short stories
Works originally published in Pearson's Magazine
Plesiosaurs in fiction